The Chasers may refer to:

 The Chasers (1959 film), a 1959 Norwegian film
 The Chasers (1965 film), a 1965 Swedish film
 Terje Rypdal’s backing band